Stilbosis synclista is a moth in the family Cosmopterigidae. It was described by Edward Meyrick in 1917. It is found in Guyana.

References

Moths described in 1917
Chrysopeleiinae
Moths of South America